Pavel Demidchik (born 30 January 1996) is a Belarusian professional footballer who plays for Arsenal Dzerzhinsk.

Career
On 21 February 2020, the Football Federation of Armenia announced that FC Yerevan had withdrawn from the league due to financial and technical problems.

References

External links 
 
 

1996 births
Living people
Belarusian footballers
Association football forwards
Belarusian expatriate footballers
FC Shakhtyor Soligorsk players
FC Slutsk players
FC Smorgon players
FC Smolevichi players
FC Yerevan players
FC Oshmyany players
FC Arsenal Dzerzhinsk players
Belarusian expatriate sportspeople in Armenia
Expatriate footballers in Armenia